The Pot Carriers is a 1962 British comedy-drama film directed by Peter Graham Scott and produced by Gordon Scott for ABPC. It stars Ronald Fraser, Paul Massie, Carole Lesley and Dennis Price. The film is largely set in Wandsworth prison and is a remake of the ITV Play of the Week: The Pot Carriers (1960), which writer Mike Watts based on his own prison experiences. The film centres around a young prisoner called Rainbow as he struggles to adjust to his first stretch behind bars.

Cast

 Ronald Fraser as Red Band
 Paul Massie as Rainbow
 Carole Lesley as Wendy
 Dennis Price as Smooth Tongue
 Paul Rogers as Governor
 Davy Kaye as Mouse
 Eddie Byrne as Chief Officer Bailey
 Campbell Singer as Prison Officer Mott
 Alfred Burke as Lang
 Patrick McAlinney as Dillon
 Neil McCarthy as Bracket
 Vanda Godsell as Mrs. Red Band
 David Davies as Prison Officer Tom
 David Ensor as Judge
 Keith Faulkner as Young Prisoner
 Norman Chappell as Prisoner Robert
 Alister Williamson as Escorting Prison Officer
 Charles Morgan as Chief Disciplinary Prison Officer
 Martin Wyldeck as Prison Officer Mullins
 Richard Shaw as Prison Officer Willis
 Clifford Earl as Prison Officer (Kitchen)
 Bruce Seton as Prison Officer I / C Cell Block
 John Tate as Prison Officer I / C Visiting Room
 Windsor Davies as Police Constable
 Frank Pettitt as Van Driver
 Sidney Vivian as Bus Conductor
 Douglas Muir as Court Usher

Critical reception
TV Guide gave the film 3 out of 5 stars, writing "Script and direction take a personable view of prison life, showing the prisoners as individuals. Though the picture is filled with humorous moments, underneath is the continual feeling of the degradation and humiliation the prisoners must endure." David McGillivray in the Radio Times also rated the film 3/5 stars, describing it as "Part social drama, part knockabout comedy, this is an odd but entertaining account of British prison life in the 1950s," and concluded that "the depiction of repetitive prison routine (the title refers to the detested practice of "slopping out") still has an impact."

References

External links
 
 

1962 films
1962 comedy-drama films
1960s English-language films
British black-and-white films
British comedy-drama films
British prison films
Films set in London
Films shot at Associated British Studios
1960s British films